Akaba is a surname. Notable people with the surname include:

Henriette Akaba (born 1992), Cameroonian football forward
, Japanese politician
Natella Akaba (Нателла Акаба, born 1945), Abkhaz historian, politician and civil society leader 
Osumana Akaba (born 1980), Ghanaian boxer
, Japanese long-distance runner

Japanese-language surnames